

List of Ambassadors
Ilan Mor 2018 - 
Zina Kalay-Kleitman 2014 - 2018
Yosef Amrani 2009 - 2014 
Shmuel Meirom 2005 - 2009
Yael Rubinstein 2003-2005
David Granit (Non-Resident, Jerusalem) 2001 - 2003

References

Croatia
Israel